Scott O'Dell (May 23, 1898 – October 15, 1989) was an American writer of 26 novels for young people, along with three novels for adults and four nonfiction books. He wrote historical fiction, primarily, including several children's novels about historical California and Mexico. For his contribution as a children's writer he received the biennial, international Hans Christian Andersen Award in 1972, the highest recognition available to creators of children's books. He received The University of Southern Mississippi Medallion in 1976 and the Catholic Libraries Association Regina Medal in 1978.

O'Dell's best known work is the historical novel Island of the Blue Dolphins (1960), which won the 1961 Newbery Medal and the 1963 Deutscher Jugendliteraturpreis in its German translation. It was also named to the Lewis Carroll Shelf Award list. He was one of the annual Newbery runners-up for three other books: The King's Fifth (1966), The Black Pearl (1967), and Sing Down the Moon (1970).

Biography

Scott O'Dell was born O'Dell Gabriel Scott, but after his name was incorrectly published on a book as "Scott O'Dell", he decided to keep the name. He was born on Terminal Island in Los Angeles, California, to parents May Elizabeth Gabriel and Bennett Mason Scott. He attended multiple colleges, including Occidental College in 1919, the University of Wisconsin–Madison in 1920, Stanford University in 1921, and the Sapienza University of Rome in 1925. During World War II, he served in the United States Army Air Forces. Before becoming a full-time writer, he was employed as a cameraman and technical director, as a book columnist for the Los Angeles Mirror, and as book review editor for the Los Angeles Daily News. He was married two times. His wives were Jane Dorsa Rattenbury, and Elizabeth Hall.

In 1934, O'Dell began writing articles as well as fiction and nonfiction books for adults. In the late 1950s, he began writing children's books.  His first children's book was Island of the Blue Dolphins.

In 1984, he established the Scott O'Dell Award for Historical Fiction, an award of $5,000 that recognizes outstanding works of historical fiction.  The winners must be published in English by a U.S. publisher and be set in the New World (North, Central, and South America).  In 1986, The Bulletin of the Center for Children's Books awarded O'Dell this same award.

Scott O'Dell died of prostate cancer on October 15, 1989 at the age of 91.

Film adaptations
There have been several film adaptations of O'Dell's work.  Island of the Blue Dolphins has been translated into a number of languages and was made into a movie in 1964, starring Celia Kaye, Larry Domasin, Ann Daniel, and George Kennedy. In 1978, Saul Swimmer produced and directed a film version of The Black Pearl with Gilbert Roland and Mario Custodio. The King's Fifth served as inspiration for the 1982 anime television series The Mysterious Cities of Gold, a Japan-France co-production that was aired in several different countries.

Selected works

Nonfiction
Representative Photoplays Analyzed, Palmer Institute of Authorship 1/1924
Country of the Sun (Southern California, an Informal Guide), Thomas Y. Crowell Co. 1/1957

Children's book series
Karana
Island of the Blue Dolphins, Houghton Mifflin 1/1960, 
Zia, Houghton Mifflin 3/1976, 

Seven Serpents
The Captive, Houghton Mifflin 1/1979,  
Feathered Serpent, Houghton Mifflin 10/1981,  
The Amethyst Ring, Houghton Mifflin 4/1983,  
omnibus Seven Serpents Trilogy, Sourcebooks Jabberwocky 3/2009,

Other novels
Woman of Spain (a Story of Old California), Houghton Mifflin 1934
Hill of the Hawk (Novel of Early California), Houghton Mifflin 1/1947
 latest edition: Kessinger Publishing 9/2010, 
The Sea is Red, Henry Holt and Company 1958
Journey to Jericho, Houghton Mifflin 8/1964, 
The King's Fifth, Houghton Mifflin 9/1966, 
The Black Pearl, Houghton Mifflin 1/1967,  
Dark Canoe, illustrated by Milton Johnson, Houghton Mifflin 1/1968
 latest edition: Sourcebooks Jabberwocky 9/2008,   
Sing Down the Moon, Houghton Mifflin 9/1970, 
Treasure of Topo-El-Bampo, Houghton Mifflin 2/1972,   
Cruise of the Arctic Star, Houghton Mifflin 3/1973,  
The Child of Fire, Houghton Mifflin 9/1974,  
The Hawk That Dare Not Hunt by Day, Houghton Mifflin 9/1975, 
The 290, Houghton Mifflin 10/1976,   
Carlota, Houghton Mifflin 10/1977,   
Kathleen Please Come Home, Houghton Mifflin 5/1978,  
Daughter of Don Saturnino, Oxford University Press 3/1979,  
Sarah Bishop (They Took Away Her Home and Her Family), Houghton Mifflin 1/1980
 latest edition: San Val 10/1999,   
The Spanish Smile, Houghton Mifflin 10/1982, 
Castle in the Sea, Houghton Mifflin 10/1983,  
Alexandra, Houghton Mifflin 4/1984,  
The Road to Damietta, Houghton Mifflin 10/1985, 
Streams to River, River to the Sea (a Novel of Sacagawea), Houghton Mifflin 4/1986, 
The Serpent Never Sleeps (a Novel of Jamestown and Pocahontas), Houghton Mifflin 9/1987, 
Black Star, Bright Dawn, Houghton Mifflin 1/1988
 latest edition: Graphia 3/2008,  
My Name Is Not Angelica, Houghton Mifflin 10/1989,  
Thunder Rolling in the Mountains, with Elizabeth Hall, Houghton Mifflin 4/1992, 
Venus Among the Fishes, with Elizabeth Hall, Houghton Mifflin 4/1995,

References

Other sources
 Commire, Anne (ed.) (1990). Something About the Author Vol. 60. Gale Research Inc.: Detroit.

External links

 ScottOdell.com (some first-person content)
 Scott O'Dell papers at University of Oregon Libraries – guide at Archives West (wsulibs.wsu.edu)
 
 Scott O'Dell at Wikisummaries

1898 births
1989 deaths
20th-century American male writers
20th-century American non-fiction writers
20th-century American novelists
American children's writers
American historical novelists
American male non-fiction writers
American male novelists
American travel writers
American writers of young adult literature
American young adult novelists
Deaths from cancer in New York (state)
Deaths from prostate cancer
Hans Christian Andersen Award for Writing winners
The Mysterious Cities of Gold
Newbery Honor winners
Newbery Medal winners
Sapienza University of Rome alumni
United States Army Air Forces personnel of World War II
Writers from Los Angeles